Xenotrecha is a monotypic genus of ammotrechid camel spiders, first described by Emilio Antonio Maury in 1982. Its single species, Xenotrecha huebneri is distributed in Brazil and Argentina.

References 

Solifugae
Arachnid genera
Monotypic arachnid genera